Religions for Peace is an international coalition of representatives from the world's religions dedicated to promoting peace founded in 1970. The International Secretariat headquarters is in New York City, with regional conferences in Europe, Asia, Middle East, Africa and the Americas. Religions for Peace enjoys consultative status with the United Nations Economic and Social Council (ECOSOC), with UNESCO and with UNICEF. As of August 2019, Azza Karam is the new Secretary General, proceeding William F. Vendley.

The first World Conference was convened in Kyoto, Japan, on 16–21 October 1970, the second World Assembly was held in Leuven, Belgium in 1974, the third in Princeton, New Jersey, United States, the fourth in Nairobi, Kenya in 1984, the fifth in Melbourne, Australia in 1989, the sixth in Riva del Garda, Italy in 1994, the seventh in Amman, Jordan in 1999, the eighth in Kyoto, Japan in 2006, the ninth World Assembly in Vienna, Austria and the tenth in Lindau, Germany.

The 2020 Sunhak Peace Prize was awarded to President Macky Sall of Senegal and Bishop Munib Younan of Religions for Peace.

In 2020 Religions For Peace was nominated for the "Freedom of Worship" Four Freedoms Award.

Sources

External links
 

Peace organizations based in the United States
Interfaith organizations
International religious organizations
Religious organizations established in 1970
International Campaign to Abolish Nuclear Weapons